Hospitality is the relationship between a guest and a host, wherein the host receives the guest with some amount of goodwill, including the reception and entertainment of guests, visitors, or strangers. Hospitality is also the way people treat others, that is, the service of welcoming and receiving guests for example in hotels. Hospitality plays a fundamental role to augment or decrease the volume of sales of an organization.

Hospitality ethics is a discipline that studies this usage of hospitality.

Etymology 
By metonymy, the Latin word  means a guest-chamber, guest's lodging, an inn.  is thus the root for the English words host, hospitality, hospice, hostel and hotel.

Historical practice
In ancient cultures, hospitality involved welcoming the stranger and offering him food, shelter, and safety.

Global concepts

Ancient Greece

In Ancient Greece, hospitality was a right, with the host being expected to make sure the needs of his guests were met. Conversely, the guest was expected to abide by a set code of behaviour.  The ancient Greek term xenia, or theoxenia when a god was involved, expressed this ritualized guest-friendship relation.  This ritualized relationship was codified in the Homeric epics, and especially in the Odyssey. In Greek society, a person's ability to abide by the laws of hospitality determined nobility and social standing. The ancient Greeks, since the time of Homer, believed that the goddess of hospitality and hearth was Hestia, one of the original six Olympians.

India and Nepal

In India and Nepal hospitality is based on the principle Atithi Devo Bhava, meaning "the guest is God". This principle is shown in a number of stories where a guest is revealed to be a god who rewards the provider of hospitality. From this stems the Indian or Nepal practice of graciousness towards guests at home and in all social situations. The Tirukkuṛaḷ, an ancient Indian work on ethics and morality, explains the ethics of hospitality through its verses 81 through 90, dedicating a separate chapter on it (chapter 9).

Judaism

Judaism praises hospitality to strangers and guests based largely on the examples of Abraham and Lot in the Book of Genesis ( and ). In Hebrew, the practice is called , meaning "welcoming guests". Besides other expectations, hosts are expected to provide nourishment, comfort, and entertainment for their guests, and at the end of the visit, hosts customarily escort their guests out of their home, wishing them a safe journey.

Abraham set the pace as providing 3 things:
 Achila ("feeding")
 Shtiya ("drinking")
 Linah ("lodging")

The initial letters of these Hebrew words spell Aishel (Genesis, 21:33).

Christianity
In Christianity, hospitality is a virtue, which is a reminder of sympathy for strangers and a rule to welcome visitors. This is a virtue found in the Old Testament, with, for example, the custom of the foot washing of visitors or the kiss of peace. It was taught by Jesus in the New Testament. Indeed, Jesus said that those who had welcomed a stranger had welcomed him. Some Western countries have developed a host culture for immigrants, based on the Bible.

John Paul II writes: "Welcoming our brothers and sisters with care and willingness must not be limited to extraordinary occasions but must become for all believers a habit of service in their daily lives."

Individuals are also treated as favored guests in the liberal Catholic tradition. Honored guests receive first parlance, religious clergy second parlance, and very important persons third parlance. Clergy and followers of Christ received parlance, and some may have turned away from hospitality, welcoming and serving, since active service requires detachment from material goods, family connections, and physical comforts. Hospitality is a meeting of minds, it is an openness to the familiar and meet to discuss and question the mystery of self, social events, experiences, nature and to God. Any guest should never made to feel or see that they are causing undue extra labor by their intrusion or presence.

It is always polite to ask about religious convictions. John Paul II said: "Only those who have opened their hearts to Christ can offer a hospitality that is never formal or superficial but identified by 'gentleness' and 'reverence'." In reference to Biblical scripture as a sign of politeness to always come to the defense and aid to those who give an account of hope and those interested (see ).

Christ expanded the meaning of brother and neighbor to include the stranger, that he or she be treated like a follower with and for hospitality and mutual help, if the believer in Christ or who may be a messenger of God either needed help, circumstances made it difficult to interpret and being uncertain of whether an individual is a believer in Christ and God.

Pashtun
One of the main principles of Pashtunwali is Melmastia. This is the display of hospitality and profound respect to all visitors (regardless of race, religion, national affiliation or economic status) without any hope of remuneration or favour. Pashtuns will go to great lengths to show their hospitality.

Islam
Islam highly recommends one another to say peace be upon you Assalamu Alaikum to one another as Muhammad had said, Muslims are obliged to treat their guest with kindness and peace, even prisoners (in war), as Muhammad had said in authentic sources and verses from the Quran.

Abu Aziz ibn Umair reported: "I was among the prisoners of war on the day of the battle of Badr. Muhammad had said, 'I enjoin you to treat the captives well.' After I accepted Islam, I was among the Ansar (Inhabitants of Madinah) and when the time of lunch or dinner arrived, I would feed dates to the prisoners for I had been fed bread due to the command of Muhammad."

Invite (all) to the Way of thy Lord with wisdom and beautiful preaching, and argue with them in ways that are best and most gracious.

Good hospitality is crucial in Islam even in business. According to another report, Muhammad passed by a pile of food in the market. He put his hand inside it and felt dampness, although the surface was dry. He said:
"O owner of the food, what is this?"

The man said, "It was damaged by rain, O Messenger of God."

He said, "Why did you not put the rain-damaged food on top so that people could see it!  Whoever cheats us is not one of us."

(Saheeh Muslim)

Celtic cultures
Celtic societies also valued the concept of hospitality, especially in terms of protection. A host who granted a person's request for refuge was expected not only to provide food and shelter for his/her guest, but to make sure they did not come to harm while under their care.

Current usage

In the West today hospitality is rarely a matter of protection and survival and is more associated with etiquette and entertainment. However, it still involves showing respect for one's guests, providing for their needs, and treating them as equals. Cultures and subcultures vary in the extent to which one is expected to show hospitality to strangers, as opposed to personal friends or members of one's ingroup.

Anthropology of hospitality
Jacques Derrida offers a model to understand hospitality that divides unconditional hospitality from conditional hospitality. Over the centuries, philosophers have devoted considerable attention to the problem of hospitality. To Derrida, there is an implicit hostility in hospitality, as it requires treating a person as a stranger, distancing them from oneself; Derrida labels this intrinsic conflict with the portmanteau "hostipitality". However, hospitality offers a paradoxical situation (like language), since the inclusion of those who are welcomed in the sacred law of hospitality implies that others will be rejected. Julia Kristeva alerts readers to the dangers of "perverse hospitality", which consists of taking advantage of the vulnerability of aliens to dispossess them. Hospitality serves to reduce the tension in the process of host–guest encounters, producing a liminal zone that combines curiosity about others and fear of strangers. In general terms, the meaning of hospitality centres on the belief that strangers should be assisted and protected while traveling. However, not all voices are in agreement with this concept. Anthony Pagden describes how the concept of hospitality was historically manipulated to legitimate the conquest of the Americas by imposing the right of free transit, which was conducive to the formation of the modern nation state. This suggests that hospitality is a political institution, which can be ideologically deformed to oppress others.

See also

 Asylum (antiquity)
 Bread and salt
 Hospitality service
 Hospitality management studies
 Hospitality law
 Hospitium
 Hotel manager
 Maître d'hôtel
 Nanawatai
 Reciprocal altruism
 Reciprocity (social psychology)
 Reciprocity (cultural anthropology)
 Sanctuary

References

Further reading
 Danny Meyer (2006) Setting the Table : The Transforming Power of Hospitality in Business
 Christine Jaszay (2006). Ethical Decision-Making in the Hospitality Industry
 Karen Lieberman & Bruce Nissen (2006). Ethics in the Hospitality And Tourism Industry
 Rosaleen Duffy and Mick Smith. The Ethics of Tourism Development
 Conrad Lashley and Alison Morrison. In Search of Hospitality
 Hospitality: A Social Lens by Conrad Lashley and Alison Morrison
 The Great Good Place by Ray Oldenburg
 Customer Service and the Luxury Guest by Paul Ruffino
 Fustel de Coulanges. The Ancient City: Religion, Laws, and Institutions of Greece and Rome
 Bolchazy. Hospitality in Antiquity: Livy's Concept of Its Humanizing Force
 Jacques Derrida (2000). Of Hospitality. Trans. Rachel Bowlby. Stanford: Stanford University Press.
 James A. W. Heffernan (2014). Hospitality and Treachery in Western Literature. New Haven, CT: Yale University Press.
 Steve Reece (1993). The Stranger's Welcome: Oral Theory and the Aesthetics of the Homeric Hospitality Scene. Ann Arbor: The University of Michigan Press.
 Mireille Rosello (2001). Postcolonial Hospitality. The Immigrant as Guest. Stanford University Press.
 Clifford J. Routes (1999). Travel and Translation in the Late Twentieth Century. Cambridge, MA: Harvard University Press.
 John B. Switzer (2007). "Hospitality" in Encyclopedia of Love in World Religions. Santa Barbara, CA: ABC-CLIO.
 Immanuel Velikovsky (1982). Mankind in Amnesia. Garden City, New York: Doubleday.
 Christian Hänggi (2009). Hospitality in the Age of Media Representation. New York/Dresden: Atropos Press.
 Thomas Claviez, ed. (2013). The Conditions of Hospitality: Ethics, Politics, and Aesthetics on the Threshold of the Possible. Bronx: Fordham University Press.

Etiquette
 
Cultural anthropology